Ultra Panavision 70 and MGM Camera 65 were, from 1957 to 1966, the marketing brands that identified motion pictures photographed with Panavision's anamorphic movie camera lenses on 65 mm film. Ultra Panavision 70 and MGM Camera 65 were shot at 24 frames per second (fps) using anamorphic camera lenses. Ultra Panavision 70 and MGM Camera 65's anamorphic lenses compressed the image 1.25 times, yielding an extremely wide aspect ratio of 2.76:1 (when a 70 mm projection print was used).

Ultra Panavision saw much less use than its sibling, the more popular Super Panavision 70, and was only used on ten films from 1957 to 1966. However, nearly fifty years later, Robert Richardson famously resurrected Ultra Panavision 70 after the lens test he came to do at the Panavision headquarters for the upcoming project with Quentin Tarantino, where he discovered that the lenses and equipment were still intact. Tarantino was fascinated by this and was able to refurbish the lenses for use in his next film, The Hateful Eight; which was shot entirely on 65mm film using Ultra Panavision lenses, the first film to do so since Khartoum. Tarantino also released the film as a roadshow release, and this was the first time there were widely circulated 70mm film prints to theaters with 70mm projectors since 1992's Far and Away. This ultimately led to a resurgence in the use of Ultra Panavision lenses, which have now been used (albeit with digital cameras) to shoot blockbusters such as Rogue One and Avengers: Endgame.

History
Metro-Goldwyn-Mayer (MGM), like other American motion picture studios, briefly experimented with a variety of widescreen formats in the late 1920s. In 1928, shortly before the Great Depression hit the film industry, William Fox of Fox Film Corporation developed the Fox Grandeur 70mm widescreen format and cameras through his partnership with the Fox-Case Corp. In 1929, Fox Film Studios introduced the Fox Grandeur widescreen photographic system which used a film 70 mm wide and had an aspect ratio of 2.13:1. The Fox Grandeur 70mm cameras were manufactured by Mitchell Camera Corp, and were designated as Mitchell FC cameras (not to be confused with the 1957 and later Mitchell 2nd generation FC and BFC 65mm widescreen camera systems). MGM licensed the Grandeur system which they called "Realife", purchased 4 of the Mitchell FC 70mm Grandeur cameras in early 1930, but abandoned the format after just two films, Billy the Kid (1930) and The Great Meadow (1931), as they had no theaters equipped to show them. Grandeur used non-standard perforations, but another format developed at around this time, by Ralph Fear of Cinema Equipment Company, used 65 mm film with standard perforations, the frame being 5 perforations high. Although these formats proved that widescreen film could be successful commercially, the deepening Great Depression and lack of theaters equipped with widescreen projection, as well as the inability of the five big studios to agree on a size for the widescreen format, doomed the format for a couple of decades. Although these formats failed to be supported at the time, the 65mm and 70mm widescreen film size and the 65mm and 70mm cameras built to use it were to form the basis of the camera format for the rebirth of the widescreen 70 mm formats introduced in the 1950s.

In 1948, a U.S. Supreme Court decision forced movie studios to divest themselves of their profitable theater chains. The loss of these theaters and the competitive pressure of television caused significant financial distress for many American motion picture studios. In 1952, the launch of Cinerama was a public sensation and suggested a way to bring studios back from the financial brink, but the triple 35mm camera systems used for this widescreen presentation were heavy, bulky, and difficult to use. Installing Cinerama in a theater was no simple matter either, as the system required three projectors, each in its own projection booth, as well as an elaborate 7-channel sound system and a special large, deeply curved screen.

MGM, in common with other studios, regarded Cinerama as being too difficult and expensive for regular movie theaters and therefore began working on a widescreen format that would work with existing theater equipment. They seemingly had forgotten or overlooked that they still had their 1930 widescreen Grandeur 70mm cameras packed away in storage. In 1953, the studio developed a process that captured images sideways on standard 35 mm film. It called the process Arnoldscope, after John Arnold, the head of MGM's photography department. Arnoldscope was similar to Paramount's VistaVision, except that it used an image ten perforations wide, rather than the eight of VistaVision. Paramount apparently also had forgotten about their 1930 widescreen venture utilizing 65mm Fearless Super Cameras. Unlike VistaVision, which had some limited use both as a camera format and as a print format, Arnoldscope was never used commercially.

Also in 1953, CinemaScope was introduced by 20th Century Fox (who again had forgotten their own 1929/30 Fox 70mm Grandeur widescreen cameras). Due to Cinemascope's compatibility with standard 35 mm projectors CinemaScope was commercially successful quickly and was the most prevalent widescreen format at the time. But CinemaScope had problems with image distortions and excessive grain. So, in 1954, Douglas Shearer, Director of Recording at MGM, approached Robert Gottschalk, president of Panavision, with a proposal for the development of a new widescreen photographic system. Shearer asked Panavision to develop a system that would retain the widescreen format (either in a 65mm or 70mm negative), eliminate the distortion effects, allow for a high-quality transfer to 35 mm, and permit a non-anamorphic transfer to 16 mm and 35 mm projection prints.  The success of Paramount Pictures' 1956 widescreen VistaVision Biblical epic The Ten Commandments convinced MGM that it should not develop its own widescreen system but rather should license the CinemaScope process from Fox and build on it.

As it happened, someone remembered the old 1930 Fox Grandeur 70mm cameras. The first cameras used for MGM's new widescreen process were not new, rather they were those four original 1930 Mitchell FC 70mm cameras built for the forgotten 70 mm Fox Grandeur system a quarter century earlier. Panavision and the Mitchell Camera Company retooled these cameras to meet the 65mm specifications submitted by MGM. New anamorphic optics were built by Panavision which were very different from CinemaScope lenses which used optical ground glass elements set in a frame to create the anamorphic image. The problem with these lenses, however, was that whatever was in the center of the image tended to be stretched wider than whatever was at the edges. In close-up shots, this distortion was particularly noticeable.  (Actors' faces became so noticeably distorted that the problem was known as the "anamorphic mumps".) Placement of a dioptre lens in front of the anamorphic lens could correct this problem, but itself created problems with focal length, required increased light on the set, and had other issues. To avoid the "anamorphic mumps", Panavision did not use an anamorphic lens. Its new system used two prisms set at angles to an anamorphic 70 mm camera lens to reduce the "anamorphic mumps" effect. This not only solved the problem, but led to a less clumsy, more easily focused camera that required less light. Panavision named the lenses "Panatar".

MGM named this new anamorphic format "MGM Camera 65". The image filmed was captured on special 65 mm Eastmancolor film stock. As with the Todd-AO format Roadshow theatrical releases in the Camera 65 format were printed on 70 mm film stock. The extra 5 mm of space on the 70 mm film stock permitted the use of the six-track stereo sound, as used on the Todd-AO 70 mm system, which audiences rarely heard at the time. For non-roadshow screenings, 35 mm prints (the type of film stock most smaller theaters could project) were made. The 35 mm print had to be "hard masked", that is, black borders ran along the top and bottom of each frame. The image's 2.76:1 aspect ratio was cropped slightly to 2.55:1 for the 35mm projection prints. Because the 65 mm film could be printed down onto 35 mm film, theaters did not need to install special, expensive 70 mm projection equipment.

Financial problems at MGM led the studio to rush Camera 65 lenses into production in 1957. MGM's Raintree County (1957) and Ben-Hur (1959) were the first MGM films to use the Camera 65 process. MGM and Panavision shared a special technical Oscar in March 1960 for developing the Camera 65 photographic process.

Panavision changed the name of the process to Ultra Panavision in 1960.

Panavision developed a non-anamorphic 70 mm photographic system from Ultra Panavision in 1959. This was named Super Panavision 70.

Differences from Todd-AO
The Ultra Panavision 70 and MGM Camera 65 lenses and cameras were similar to the 1955 version of the Todd-AO 65 mm photographic process. The original Todd-AO cameras were built from retooled 1930 Fearless Super Cameras. But the Todd-AO system was shot at 30 frames per second (fps), while Ultra Panavision 70 and MGM Camera 65 used the industry standard of 24 fps, and while the original Todd-AO process included the use of a deeply curved screen similar to that used for Cinerama, Ultra Panavision 70/Camera 65 was intended for projection onto a flat screen. Finally Ultra Panavision 70/Camera 65 compressed the image anamorphically 1.25 times, yielding an aspect ratio of 2.76:1 (when a 70 mm projection print was used) while Todd-AO used spherical lenses giving an aspect ratio of 2.20:1.

Films
The following films were lensed in either Camera 65 or Ultra Panavision 70:
 Raintree County (1957) – credited as MGM Camera 65.
 Ben-Hur (1959) – credited as MGM Camera 65.
 How the West Was Won (1962) – selected scenes only in Ultra Panavision.
 Mutiny on the Bounty (1962) – credited as Ultra Panavision.
 It's a Mad, Mad, Mad, Mad World (1963) – filmed in Ultra Panavision. Also projected using the single-projector Cinerama system.
 The Fall of the Roman Empire (1964) – credited as Ultra Panavision.
 The Greatest Story Ever Told (1965) – filmed in Ultra Panavision. Also originally projected using the single-projector Cinerama system.
 The Hallelujah Trail (1965) – filmed in Ultra Panavision. Also originally projected using the single-projector Cinerama system.
 Battle of the Bulge (1965) – filmed in Ultra Panavision. Also originally projected using the single-projector Cinerama system.
 Khartoum (1966) – filmed in Ultra Panavision. Also originally projected using the single-projector Cinerama system.
 The Hateful Eight (2015) – Directed by Quentin Tarantino, first film shot in this process since Khartoum. Filmed in Ultra Panavision 70 and projected with the single-projector Cinerama system in selected theaters.
 Christopher Robin (2018) – some scenes filmed in Ultra Panavision 70. Also filmed with Panavision 35 mm anamorphic lenses (on both 35 mm film and Arri Alexa digital cameras) and in Panavision System 65 with spherical lenses. The entire film is shown in the 2.40:1 aspect ratio.
Many sources often claim the 1959 film The Big Fisherman was filmed in Ultra Panavision, but Panavision itself says that the film was shot in Super Panavision 70.

Additionally, several films have been recorded digitally in conjunction with Ultra Panavision 70 lenses: Rogue One (2016), Bright (2017), Avengers: Infinity War (2018), Avengers: Endgame (2019) and The King (2019) with the Arri Alexa 65 camera, and The Hate U Give (2018) and Like a Boss (2020) with the Panavision Millennium DXL camera.

See also
 Super Technirama 70

References

Bibliography
 Altman, Rick. Sound Theory, Sound Practice. Florence, Ky.: Psychology Press, 1992.
 Balio, Tino. United Artists: The Company That Changed the Film Industry. Madison, Wisc.: University of Wisconsin Press, 1987.
 Belton, John. Widescreen Cinema. Cambridge, Mass.: Harvard University Press, 1992.
 Block, Alex Ben and Wilson, Lucy Autrey. George Lucas's Blockbusting: A Decade-by-Decade Survey of Timeless Movies, Including Untold Secrets of Their Financial and Cultural Success. New York: HarperCollins, 2010.
 Burum, Stephen H. American Cinematographer Manual. Hollywood, Calif.: ASC Press, 2007.
 Cameron, James Ross. Cameron's Encyclopedia on Sound Motion Pictures. Manhattan Beach, N.Y.: Cameron Pub. Co., 1930.
 Casper, Drew. Postwar Hollywood, 1946-1962. Malden, Mass.: Blackwell, 2007.
 Carr, Robert E. and Hayes, R.M. Wide Screen Movies. Jefferson, NC: McFarland, 1988.
 Clark, Al. The Film Year Book 1984. New York : Grove Press, 1983.
 Eldridge, David. Hollywood's History Films. London: Tauris, 2006.
 Enticknap, Leo. Moving Image Technology: From Zoetrope to Digital. London: Wallflower, 2005.
 Eyman, Scott. The Speed of Sound: Hollywood and the Talkie Revolution, 1926-1930. New York: Simon and Schuster, 1997.
 Haines, Richard W. Technicolor Movies: The History of Dye Transfer Printing. Jefferson, N.C.: McFarland, 1993.
 Hall, Sheldon and Neale, Stephen. Epics, Spectacles, and Blockbusters: A Hollywood History. Detroit: Wayne State University Press, 2010.
 Hughes, Howard. When Eagles Dared: The Filmgoers' History of World War II. London: I.B. Tauris, 2011.
 Hutchison, David. Film Magic: The Art and Science of Special Effects. New York: Prentice-Hall, 1987.
 IMAGO. Making Pictures: A Century of European Cinematography. New York: Abrams, 2003.
 Lev, Peter. Transforming the Screen: 1950-1959. Berkeley, Calif.: University of California Press, 2003.
 Lightman, Herb A. "Why MGM Chose Camera 65." American Cinematographer. March 1960.
 McGhee, Richard D. John Wayne: Actor, Artist, Hero. Jefferson, N.C.: McFarland & Co., 1990.
 Reid, John Howard. 20th Century-Fox: CinemaScope. Morrisville, N.C.: Lulu Press, 2009.
 Samuelson, David W. Panaflex Users' Manual. Boston: Focal Press, 1996.
 Sklar, Robert. Film: An International History of the Medium. New York: Prentice Hall 1993.
 Tibbetts, John C. American Classic Screen Features. Lanham, Md.: Scarecrow Press, 2010.
 Ward, Peter. Picture Composition for Film and Television. Oxford, UK: Focal, 2003.

70 mm film
Metro-Goldwyn-Mayer
Motion picture film formats
Panavision
Products introduced in 1957